This is not to be confused with the independent, research-based organization of Toronto, Canada, also called "Federated Press" that targets executives, lawyers, professionals.

The Federated Press was a left wing news service, established in 1920, that provided daily content to the radical and labor press in America, characterized widely from a mere "labor wire service" or "a kind of left-wing AP" to widely known for having "employed many Communist editors and correspondents," "so closely allied to the Communist party of America as to be regarded by the Communists as their official press association," or just "the Red's Federated Press."

History

Federated Press
The People's Council of America, established in New York City in May 1917 and headed by Scott Nearing and Louis P. Lochner, produced a monthly publication called People's Council Bulletin, which featured international news with an emphasis on the doings of the peace movement. The editor of this publication was William E. Williams, press spokesman of the People's Council. This bulletin proved the inspiration for the International Labor News Service, itself a news agency for the radical press, as octogenarian Scott Nearing recounted in his 1972 memoirs:   <blockquote><small>One day... a big, sturdy chap just past middle age came into our New York People's Council office and showed credentials from the Western Metal Miners. He had been reading our Bulletin and liked the material, especially that dealing with international affairs. 'If you will put this material into a regular news service,' he told us, 'our organization will help pay for it and circulate it. Here is our first contribution' and he put a $20 bill on the desk.<ref>Nearing erroneously recalls this event as having happened in 1921, that is, a date after the merger of the International Labor News Service with the Federated Press. Nearing,The Making of a Radical," pg. 173.</ref></small></blockquote>     In Milwaukee, Wisconsin, a similar concept was being tested by Edward J. Costello, Managing Editor of Victor Berger's socialist daily, the Milwaukee Leader. This news service, called the Federated Press, was founded on January 3, 1920, and was intended to supply copy to labor and radical newspapers around the country. The two news agencies decided to join forces under the Federated Press banner, with Costello holding down the post of Managing Editor of the Service and Lochner acting as Business Manager. Nearing provided the service with regular installments of his writing. The service grew steadily and was ultimately mailing news releases and picture mats five days a week to some 150 labor and radical publications.    William F. Dunne was another co-founder.

In August 1920, conscientious objector and university instructor Carl Haessler was released from federal penitentiary after serving a two-year sentence. He took over the job of managing editor from Costello, who left the employment of the service. Haessler remained at this position until the service was terminated in the 1940s.

Federated Press League
On February 4, 1922, a "Federated Press League" (FPL) formed in Chicago to collect funds for the news service.  Members of the league's executive board included:  Robert M. Buck, Jack Carney, Arul Swabeck, Editor Feinburg, William Z. Foster (later CPUSA head), Carl Haessler, Mabel Search, Clark H. Getts, Louis P. Lochner, and Maude McCreery.

In 1923 during the trial of communist leader C. E. Ruthenberg in St. Joseph, Michigan, the government prosecutor spent considerable effort while cross-examining Jay Lovestone in establishing links between the Communist Party and the Federated Press.  The prosecutor attempted to prove that all funding for the Federated Press came only from "Communist sources."  Lovestone held the position that the Communist Party had tried to influence the Federated Press but had never controlled it.  (In his 1952 memoir, Whittaker Chambers directly contradicts Lovestone by calling it the "communist-controlled news service of my Daily Worker days.")

Nearing continued to produce content for the Federated Press until 1943, when he was fired for his anti-war politics, which managing editor Haessler deemed to be "childish".

The service was discontinued after the end of World War II, when the more conservative labor papers terminated their use of the service.

Locations

The Federated Press had its headquarters at 156 W. Washington Street in Chicago (where it shared offices with the ACLU, the Chicago Committee for Struggle Against War, the Acme News Syndicate, and the Institute for Mortuary Research).  It had bureaus in New York, San Francisco, and Washington DC (where it shared offices with the Soviet official news agency TASS).

The Federated Press had foreign bureaus in Berlin and Moscow.

Clients

A major client of the Federated Press was the Communist Party USA, which subscribed to feed its newspaper the Daily Worker.

In 1922, newspapers that used Federated Press service included 23 in Illinois, 17 in New York, 7 in California, 5 in Minnesota, 4 in Washington, and some 2 dozen in the Midwest and New England.

Funding

 Garland Fund (administered by trustees headed by Roger Nash Baldwin of the American Civil Liberties Union)
 Robert Marshall Foundation, which also funded "Farm Research" by Harold Ware, founder of the Ware Group spy ring)

People

Founders:  
 William Francis Dunne (CPUSA leader)
 Carl Haessler (Chicago Workers School)
 Louis Lochner (Milwaukee Leader)
 Scott Nearing
 Leland Olds

Editors:
 Helen Augur (1920)
 E.J. Costello (1921-1922)
 Carl Haessler (1922-1940)

Bureau Chiefs:
 Louis P. Lochner (Berlin)
 Anna Louise Strong  

Correspondents:  

 Abner Carroll Binder
 Carl Braden
 Joe Carroll  
 Albert F. Coyle (also editor of the Locomotive Engineers Journal)
 Horace B. Davis
 Len De Caux
 Miriam Allen deFord
 Robert W. Dunn 
 William Z. Foster (later CPUSA head)
 Conrad Friberg
 Betty Friedan  
 Ida Glatt (mother of John McCarthy (computer scientist))
 Travis K. Hedrick
 Fred C. Howe
 Grace Hutchins
 Stetson Kennedy ("Inside Out" column 1937-1950)
 Eugene Lyons
 Maud Leonard McCreery
 Alfred Maund
 Harvey O'Connor
 Jessie Lloyd O'Connor  
 Leland Olds
 Frank L. Palmer
 Julia Ruuttila
 James Peck (pacifist)
 Marc Stone (brother of I.F. Stone
 Laurence Todd

Legacy

Karla Kelling Sclater has stated:  The Federated Press has also been ignored in the historiography. A news-gathering cooperative, the Federated Press, which began in 1920, was the first news service that provided affiliated papers with international reports of interest to the working class. Jon Bekken states that the Federated Press survived into the early 1950s as the only independent news service that supplied information to 150 papers including newspapers in Germany, Russia and Australia. Labor, socialist, and other newspapers utilized the Federated Press. To date, only one unpublished master's thesis discusses Carl Haessler, one of the founders of the Federated Press wire service, and the Federated Press.

Works

Federated Press Bulletin
The Federated Press published an English-language weekly Federated Press Bulletin out of Chicago from 1921 to 1925, of which Haessler was associate editor.

Labor Letter
The Federated Press published an English-language weekly Federated Press Labor Letter out of Chicago from 1925 to 1929.

Labor's News
The Federated Press published an English-language weekly Labor's News, successor to its Labor Letter, out of New York from 1929 to 1931.

Supported publications
By 1922, the Federated Press had helped establish eight weekly newspapers, including the South Bend (IN) Free Press,  Centralia (IL) Labor World, Iowa Farm and Labor News, Producers Review (IL),  Tri-City Labor News (Christopher, IL), The Labor Advocate (Racine, WI),  and Cahoka Valley (IL) News. Bérmunkás (The Wage Worker''), Hungarian language newspaper, was affiliated with the Federated Press.

See also
 Liberation News Service
 Underground Press Syndicate

References

External links
 Marxist History: Federated Press - Constitution (April 1921)
 Marxist History: Federated Press - Organizational History
 Columbia University - Federated Press
 Columbia University - Federated Press records microform
 Gale - Federated Press Records: Series 2 and 3
 Gale - Introduction: Federated Press Records: Series 1: Parts 1-4: Subject Files
 Gale - Introduction: Federated Press Records: Series 3: Chronological Files, 1920-1940
 Library of Congress - Federated Press Bulletin
 Library of Congress - Labor's News
 Library of Congress - Federated Press Bulletin

1920 establishments in the United States
News agencies based in the United States
Communist Party USA publications